The fourth season of Let's Dance began on 23 March 2011.

The judges for this season were confirmed in March 2011 as Joachim Llambi, Harald Glööckler, Motsi Mabuse as a replacement of Isabel Edvardsson and Roman Frieling as a replacement of Peter Kraus. It was reported in February 2011 that Isabel Edvardsson and Peter Kraus would not return in season 4, after being judges for only one series.

Couples

Judges scores

Red numbers indicate the lowest score for each week.
Green numbers indicate the highest score for each week.
 indicates the couple eliminated that week.
 indicates the returning couples that finished in the bottom three or bottom two.
 indicates the couple was eliminated but later returned to the competition.
 indicates the couple withdrew.
 indicated the couple that did not dance due personal reasons.
 indicates the winning couple.
 indicates the runner-up couple.

Average Chart

Highest and lowest scoring performances 
The best and worst performances in each dance according to the judges' marks are as follows:

Highest and lowest scoring performances
According to the traditional 40-point scale.

Weekly scores and songs

Week 1

Individual judges scores in charts below (given in parentheses) are listed in this order from left to right: Roman Frieling, Harald Glööckler, Motsi Mabuse, Joachim Llambi.
Running order

Week 2

Running order

Week 3

Bernd Herzsprung chose not to participate this week due to the recent death of his mother.

Running order

Week 4

Running order

Week 5

Running order

Week 6

Running order

Week 7

Running order

Week 8

Running order

Week 9

Running order

Dance Chart
 Week 1: Cha-Cha-Cha or Waltz
 Week 2: Rumba or Quickstep
 Week 3: Jive or Tango
 Week 4: Viennese Waltz or Salsa
 Week 5: Paso Doble or Samba
 Week 6: One unlearned dance and Fox-a-thon
 Week 7: Two unlearned dances from previous shows
 Week 8: Two unlearned dances from previous shows
 Finals:  Judges Redemption Dance, Favourite dance of the Season, Freestyle

Call-out order
The table below lists the order in which the contestants' fates were revealed. The order of the safe couples doesn't reflect the viewer voting results.

 This couple came in first place with the judges.
 This couple came in last place with the judges.
 This couple was eliminated.
 This couple came in last place with the judges and was eliminated.
 This couple won the competition.
 This couple came in second in the competition.
 This couple came in third in the competition.

External links
 Official website

Let's Dance (German TV series)
2011 German television seasons

de:Let’s Dance (Fernsehsendung)
pl:Let's Dance (Niemcy)